One Lonesome Saddle is a self-released album by Ray Lamontagne. A small number of copies were given away and sold to various people before Ray Lamontagne instructed the album's producer Carl Franklin (no relation to film director and actor) to "Bury the recordings".

Track listing
Two different versions of the album exist, with slightly different track listings on each.

Version 1
 "Down to the River"
 "One Lonesome Saddle"
 "Roadhouse Girl"
 "Poor Boy"
 "Carry Me"
 "Hobo Blues"
 "Sugar Mama"
 "Shucking the Corn"
 "Whiskey Train"
 "Shelter"
 "Crazy Dreamers"

The "OLS Sessions"
 "Vigilante Man"
 "Hobo Blues"
 "One Lonesome Saddle"
 "Poor Boy"
 "Carry Me"
 "Whiskey Train"
 "Shelter"
 "Big Boned Woman"
 "Still Can't Feel the Gin"
 "Roadhouse Girl"
 "Everything I Need"

Ray LaMontagne albums